Euphorbia mosaic virus (EuMV) is a plant pathogenic virus of the family Geminiviridae.

External links
ICTVdB - The Universal Virus Database: Euphorbia mosaic virus

Viral plant pathogens and diseases
Begomovirus